Labeobarbus urotaenia is a species of ray-finned fish in the genus Labeobarbus from the central Congo River system..

References

 

urotaenia
Taxa named by George Albert Boulenger
Fish described in 1913
Endemic fauna of the Democratic Republic of the Congo